The 2001 Gael Linn Cup, the most important representative competition for elite level participants in the women's team field sport of camogie, was won by Munster, who defeated Connacht in the final, played at Bohernabreena.

Arrangements
Munster defeated Ulster 5–16 to 3–7. Connacht defeated Leinster by a point 0–13 to 1–9. Munster, with eight Tipperary players, defeated holders Connacht 1–18 to 1–9 in the final.

Gael Linn Trophy
Munster defeated Ulster 2–8 to 0–5. Leinster defeated Connacht 3–9 to 1–10. Aoife Neary scored the decisive goal as Leinster defeated Munster 1–14 to 1–11 in the final.

Final stages

|}

Junior Final

|}

References

External links
 Camogie Association

2001 in camogie
2001